Giovanni Battista Merano (1632-1698) was an Italian painter of the Baroque period, mainly active in Genoa.

Biography
He was born in Genoa. He was one of the pupils of the Genoese Valerio Castello. He spent some years in Parma, returning after the death of Castello, and painted in various churches. He appears unrelated to Francesco Merano. He returned to Parma in 1668, where he soon obtained a pension from the Duke Ranuccio II. Merano painted the chapel in the Ducal Palace of Colorno. 
He also painted frescoes for the chapels of the church of San Giovanni Evangelista belonging to the Benedictines.

In 1698, he painted in the town of San Remo. Among his disciples were Giovanni Battista Resoaggi and Davide Campi.

References

External links

1632 births
17th-century Italian painters
Italian male painters
Painters from Genoa
Italian Baroque painters
1698 deaths